Aspergillus coremiiformis is a species of fungus in the genus Aspergillus. It is from the Flavi section. The species was first described in 1979. It has been shown to produce indol alkaloids.

Growth and morphology

A. coremiiformis has been cultivated on both Czapek yeast extract agar (CYA) plates and Malt Extract Agar Oxoid® (MEAOX) plates. The growth morphology of the colonies can be seen in the pictures below.

References 

coremiiformis
Fungi described in 1979